The Buick Electra E5 is a battery electric mid-size crossover SUV  to be manufactured by General Motors under the Buick brand. It will be produced by SAIC-GM joint venture in China in the first half of 2023. It is equipped with GM Ultium batteries shared with other GM battery electric vehicles, and will be equipped with the Super Cruise driving assistance system.

It is the first vehicle under the Electra sub-brand of Buick electric vehicles, a name reused from the Buick Electra produced between 1959 and 1990.

References

External links 

 

Electra E5
Cars introduced in 2022
Mid-size sport utility vehicles
Crossover sport utility vehicles
Front-wheel-drive vehicles
Production electric cars